Assenay is a commune in the Aube department in the Grand Est region of north-central France.

The inhabitants of the commune are known as Asnacussiens.

Geography
Assenay is located some 12 km south of Saint-André-les-Vergers and 4 km east by north-east of Villery. Access to the commune is by the D1 23 road from Saint-Jean-de-Bonneval in the south-west passing through the village and continuing to Villy-le-Maréchal in the north-east. The D 25 road from Saint-Jean-de-Bonneval to Moussey also passes through the north of the commune. Apart from a few scattered patches of forest the commune is entirely farmland.

The Mogne river flows through the south of the commune from south-west to north-east. The Ruisseau d'Ormont flows eastwards through the village to join the Mogne east of the commune.

Neighbouring communes and villages

Administration

List of Successive Mayors

Demography
In 2017 the commune had 146 inhabitants.

See also
Communes of the Aube department

References

External links
Assenay on the old IGN website 
Assenay on Géoportail, National Geographic Institute (IGN) website 
Assenay on the 1750 Cassini Map

Communes of Aube